The Turbo A.C.'s are an American punk rock band from New York City, United States, formed in 1995. The band's high-octane sound has led to comparisons with the likes of The Supersuckers and New Bomb Turks.

Band history 
In 1996, the band released their first full-length album, Damnation Overdrive, on New York based hardcore label, Blackout Records. This was followed by releases on Cacophone, Nitro Records and Gearhead Records. The band's catalog features a number of punk personalities producing, including Agnostic Front's Roger Miret and the Dwarves' Blag Dahlia.

The band's name is a reference to the Turnbull A.C.'s, a fictional gang featured briefly in the 1979 Walter Hill film, The Warriors.

They have frequently toured Europe following releases on the German label, Bitzcore Records.

Bassist Mike Dolan left the band in 2005 to start a band in the vein of The Hellacopters and Motörhead called The FTW's.

Drummer Mikey Montreal plays in the Montreal based band The Von Rebels.

Mikey Millionaire also plays in the Newport, Rhode Island based Skinny Millionaires

Lineup
Band members
 Kevin Cole - guitar, vocals
 Mikey Millionaire - guitar, acoustic guitar, vocals
 Eric Bhell - bass, vocals
 Mikey Montreal - drums, vocals

Former members
 Mike Dolan - bass, vocals
 Kevin Prunty - drums, vocals
 Tim Lozada - bass, vocals
 Jer VonDuck - guitar, vocals

Discography

Albums
Damnation Overdrive (1996) Blackout! Records
Winner Take All (1998) Cacophone Records
Fuel for Life (2001) Nitro Records
Automatic (2003) Gearhead Records/Bitzcore Records
Avenue X (2005) Gearhead Records/Bitzcore Records
Live To Win (2006) Bitzcore Records
Kill Everyone (2011) Stomp Records
Radiation (2018) Concrete Jungle Records/Stomp Records

Other
 "Gonna Get It" 7" (1995) 
 Supercharged Straight To Hell" (1995, Turbo Titans Records)
 "Eat My Dust" / "Righteous Ruler" 7" (1995, Blackout! Records)
 "Chupacabra!" 7" (1997, Blackout! Records)
 Hellboys/Turbo A.C.'s Split 7" (1997, Explicit Sound Records)
 "Hit & Run" 7" (1999, Into The Vortex)
 "Hit The Road" 10" Picture Disc (1999, Community/Renate Records)
 Clean'' Split with The Demonics (2000, Radio Blast Records)

References

External links
 
 Official Fanclub
 [ Turbo A.C.'s] at Allmusic

Punk rock groups from New York (state)
Garage punk groups
Garage rock groups from New York (state)